Khövsgöl is the northernmost of the 21 aimags (provinces) of Mongolia. The name is derived from Lake Khövsgöl.

Geography and history
The round-topped Tarvagatai, Bulnain and Erchim sub-ranges of the Khangai massif dominate the south and southwest of the largely mountainous province, and north and west of Lake Khövsgöl, lie the alpine Khoridol Saridag, Ulaan Taiga, and Mönkh Saridag mountains. The center and eastern parts of the province are less mountainous, but still hilly.

The region is well known in Mongolia for its natural environment, and Lake Khövsgöl is one of the country's major tourist attractions. The largest forests of Mongolia are located around and to the north of the lake, extending the South Siberian taiga.

The aimag was founded in 1931. Khatgal was the administrative center until 1933; since then it has been Mörön.

Population
The region is home to many ethnic minority groups: Darkhad, Khotgoid, Uriankhai, Buriad, and Tsaatan. Both the Darkhad and Tsaatan are famous for their practice of shamanism.

Famous Khövsgölians

Famous people from Khuvsgul include:
 Chingünjav, leader of an anti-Manchu rebellion in 1756/57,
 Öndör Gongor, was a very tall man in early-20th century Mongolia,
 Jalkhanz Khutagt Damdinbazar, a prime minister of Mongolia in the early 1920s,
 Gelenkhüü, an inventor and hero of local folklore.
Oyungerel Tsedevdamba, activist, first Mongolian to graduate from Stanford
Henning Haslund-Christensen, a Danish traveller and explorer, spent one or two years in a place that today is in Erdenebulgan sum in the early 1920s. Some locals believe that Alan Gua, a female ancestor of Genghis Khan, hails from what is now Chandmani-Öndör.

Livestock

In 2007, the aimag was home to about 3.43 million heads of livestock, among them about 1,510,000 goats, 1,442,000 sheep, 322,000 cattle and yaks, 150,000 horses, 2,350 camels, and 652 reindeer.

Transportation

The Mörön Airport (ZMMN/MXV) has one paved runway. It offers regular flights from and to Ulaanbaatar, and also serves as intermediate stop into the western Aimags.

The Khatgal Airport (HTM) only runs scheduled flights from and to Ulaanbaatar in summer, offering a more direct approach to Lake Khövsgöl for the tourists.

The road distance from Mörön to Ulaanbaatar is 690 km. A new paved road finished in fall 2012 now connects Mörön to Khatgal on Lake Khövsgöl.

Administrative subdivisions

Gallery

Notes and references

External links 

 
Provinces of Mongolia
States and territories established in 1931
1931 establishments in Mongolia